Treaties between the Kievan Rusʹ and the Byzantine Empire:
Rusʹ–Byzantine Treaty (907)
Rusʹ–Byzantine Treaty (911), supplementary agreement to the one of 907
Rusʹ–Byzantine Treaty (945)
Rus'–Byzantine Treaty (971)
Rus'–Byzantine Treaty (1045)

See also

 Old Russian Law
 Russkaya Pravda